Ballet BC is a contemporary ballet company located in Vancouver, British Columbia.

History
Ballet BC is a professional contemporary ballet company based in Vancouver, British Columbia, Canada. The company was founded as Ballet British Columbia by Jean Orr, David Y. H. Lui and Sheila Begg in 1986, with Annette av Paul as first Artistic Director. 

Artistic direction passed to Reid Anderson, Patricia Neary and Barry Ingham and in 1992 to John Alleyne, who introduced a program with original choreography including his The Faerie Queen in 2000 and dances by other Canadian choreographers. Alleyne was followed by Emily Molnar after the reorganization in 2009. Molnar was followed by Medhi Walerski in 2020.

, the company is the only professional ballet company in British Columbia. It is based in the Queen Elizabeth Theatre.

Repertoire
Ballet BC presents a repertoire of contemporary ballet.

The company opened the 2015 Jacob's Pillow Dance Festival, presenting three dances each by a different choreographer, including Twenty Eight Thousand Waves by their own resident choreographer Cayetano Soto. The company travelled on their 30th anniversary tour in late 2015 and 2016.

References

External links

Archive footage of Ballet BC performing Aniel in 2013 at Jacob's Pillow
Archive footage of Ballet BC performing Consagración in 2015 at Jacob's Pillow

Ballet companies in Canada
Companies based in Vancouver
Performing arts in Vancouver
Performing groups established in the 1980s
1986 establishments in British Columbia